A death march is a forced march of prisoners of war or other captives or deportees in which individuals are left to die along the way. It is distinguished in this way from simple prisoner transport via foot march. Article 19 of the Geneva Convention requires that prisoners must be moved away from a danger zone such as an advancing front line, to a place that may be considered more secure. It is not required to evacuate prisoners that are too unwell or injured to move. In times of war such evacuations can be difficult to carry out.

Death marches usually feature harsh physical labor and abuse, neglect of prisoner injury and illness, deliberate starvation and dehydration, humiliation, torture, and execution of those unable to keep up the marching pace. The march may end at a prisoner-of-war camp or internment camp, or it may continue until all the prisoners are dead.

Examples

Before World War II 

 Forced marches were utilized for slaves who were bought or captured by slave traders in Africa. They were shipped to other lands as part of the East African slave trade with Zanzibar and the Atlantic slave trade. Sometimes, the merchants shackled them and didn't give them enough food. Slaves who became too weak to walk were frequently killed or left to die.

David Livingstone wrote of the East African slave trade: 

 In 1127, during the Jin–Song Wars, the forces of the Jurchen-led Jin dynasty besieged and sacked the Imperial palaces in Bianjing (present-day Kaifeng), the capital of the Han-led Song dynasty. The Jin forces captured the Song ruler, Emperor Qinzong, along with his father, the retired Emperor Huizong, and many members of the imperial family of Emperor Taizong's bloodline and officials of the Song imperial court. According to The Accounts of Jingkang, Jin troops looted the entire imperial library and the decorations in the palace. Jin troops also abducted all the female servants and imperial musicians. The imperial family was abducted and their residences were looted. All the female prisoners were ordered, on pain of death, to serve the Jin aristocrats no matter what rank in society they had previously held. A Jin prince wanted to marry Emperor Huizong's daughter, Zhao Fujin, who had been another man's wife. Later on, the emperor's concubines were also given to the prince by Emperor Taizong. To avoid captivity and slavery under the Jurchens, many palace women committed suicide. The captives marched to the Jin capital along with the assets. Over 14,000 people, including the Song imperial family, went on this journey. Their entourage – almost all the ministers and generals of the Northern Song dynasty – suffered from illness, dehydration and exhaustion, and many never made it. Upon arrival, each person had to go through a ritual where the person has to be naked and wearing only sheep skins.

 As part of Indian removal in the United States, approximately 6,000 Choctaw were forced to leave Mississippi and move to Oklahoma in 1831, and only about 4,000 of them arrived in Oklahoma in 1832.
 In 1836, after the Creek War, the United States Army deported 2,500 Muskogee from Alabama in chains as prisoners of war. The rest of the tribe (12,000) followed, deported by the Army. Upon arrival in Oklahoma, 3,500 died of infection.
 In 1838, the Cherokee nation was forced by order of President Andrew Jackson to march westward towards Oklahoma. This march became known as the Trail of Tears: an estimated 4,000 men, women, and children died during relocation.
 When the Round Valley Indian Reservation was established, the Yuki people (as they came to be called) of Round Valley were forced into a difficult and unusual situation. Their traditional homeland was not completely taken over by settlers as in other parts of California. Instead, a small part of it was reserved especially for their use as well as the use of other Indians, many of whom were enemies of the Yuki. The Yuki had to share their home with strangers who spoke other languages, lived with other beliefs, and who used the land and its products differently. Indians came to Round Valley as they did to other reservations - by force. The word "drive", widely used at the time, is descriptive of the practice of "rounding up" Indians and "driving" them like cattle to the reservation where they were "corralled" by high picket fences. Such drives took place in all weather and seasons, and the elderly and sick often did not survive. (Part of California Genocide)
 Long Walk of the Navajo
 In August 1863 all Konkow Maidu were to be sent to the Bidwell Ranch in Chico and then be taken to the Round Valley Reservation at Covelo in Mendocino County. Any Indians remaining in the area were to be shot. Maidu were rounded up and marched under guard west out of the Sacramento Valley and through to the Coastal Range. 461 Native Americans started the trek, 277 finished. They reached Round Valley on 18 September 1863. (Part of California Genocide)
 After the Yavapai Wars 375 Yavapai perished in Indian Removal deportations out of 1,400 remaining Yavapai.
King Leopold II sanctioned the creation of "child colonies" in his Congo Free State which had orphaned Congolese kidnapped and sent to schools operated by Catholic Missionaries in which they would learn to work or be soldiers; these were the only schools funded by the state. More than 50% of the children sent to the schools died of disease, and thousands more died in the forced marches into the colonies. In one such march 108 boys were sent over to a mission school and only 62 survived, eight of whom died a week later.
 During the 1862 through 1877 Dungan Revolt 700,000 to 800,000 Hui Muslims from Shaanxi were deported to Gansu, in a process in which most were killed along the way from thirst, starvation, and massacres by the militia escorting them, with only a few thousand surviving.
 The Armenian genocide resulted in the death of up to 1,500,000 people from 1915 to 1918. Under the cover of World War I, the Young Turks sought to cleanse Turkey of its Armenian population. As a result, much of the Armenian population was exiled from large parts of Western Armenia and forced to march to the Syrian Desert. Many were raped, tortured, and killed on their way to the 25 concentration camps set up in the Syrian Desert. The most infamous camp was that of Der Zor, where an estimated 150,000 Armenians were killed.
 Grand Duke Nicolas (who was still commander-in-chief of the Western forces), after suffering serious defeats at the hands of the German army, decided to implement the decrees for the German Russians living under his army's control, principally in the Volhynia province. The lands were to be expropriated, and the owners deported to Siberia. The land was to be given to Russian war veterans once the war was over. In July 1915, without prior warning, 150,000 German settlers from Volhynia were arrested and shipped to internal exile in Siberia and Central Asia. (Some sources indicate that the number of deportees reached 200,000). Ukrainian peasants took over their lands. The mortality rate from these deportations is estimated to have been 63,000 to 100,000, that is from 30% to 50%, but exact figures are impossible to determine.
 In the eastern part of Russian Turkestan, after the suppression of the Urkun uprising against the Russian Empire tens of thousands of surviving Kyrgyz and Kazakhs fled toward China. In the Tien-Shan Mountains they died by the thousands in mountain passes over 3,000 meters high.

During World War II 

During World War II, death marches of POWs occurred in both Nazi-Occupied Europe and the Japanese Empire. Death marches of Jews were common in the later stages of The Holocaust as the Allies closed in on concentration camps in occupied Europe.

 During Operation Barbarossa, particularly during 1941–42 when large numbers of Soviet prisoners were captured, death marches were among the forms of German mistreatment of Soviet prisoners of war. Considered to be a German war crime.
 After the Battle of Stalingrad in February 1943, many German prisoners of war were left to die on march. After the initial captivity near Stalingrad they were sent on a "death march across the frozen steppe" to labor camps elsewhere in the Soviet Union.
 In the Pacific Theatre, the Imperial Japanese Army conducted death marches of Allied POWs, including the infamous Bataan Death March (1942) and the Sandakan Death Marches (1945). The former forcibly transferred 60–80,000 POWs to Balanga, resulting in the deaths of 2,500–10,000 Filipinos and 100–650 Americans, the latter causing the deaths of 2,345 Australians and British, of which only 6 survived. Lieutenant General Masaharu Homma was charged with failure to control his troops in 1945 in connection with the Bataan Death March. Both the Bataan and Sandakan death marches were judged as war crimes.
 The term "death march" was used in the context of the World War II history by victims and then by historians to refer to the forcible movement between fall 1944 and April 1945 by Nazi Germany of thousands of prisoners, from Nazi concentration camps near the advancing war fronts to camps inside Germany. One infamous death march occurred in January 1945, as the Soviet Red Army advanced on occupied Poland. Nine days before the Soviets arrived at the death camp at Auschwitz, the SS marched nearly 60,000 prisoners out of the camp towards Wodzisław Śląski (German: Loslau), 35 miles away, where they were put on freight trains to other camps. Approximately 15,000 prisoners died on the way. The death marches were judged as a crime against humanity.
 Population transfer in the Soviet Union refers to forced transfer of various groups from the 1930s up to the 1950s ordered by Joseph Stalin and may be classified into the following broad categories: deportations of "anti-Soviet" categories of population (often classified as "enemies of workers"), deportations of entire nationalities, labor force transfer, and organized migrations in opposite directions to fill the ethnically cleansed territories. Soviet archives documented 390,000 deaths during kulak forced resettlement and up to 400,000 deaths of persons deported to forced settlements in the Soviet Union during the 1940s; however Steven Rosefield and Norman Naimark put overall deaths closer to some 1 to 1.5 million perishing as a result of the deportations — of those deaths, the deportation of Crimean Tatars and the deportation of Chechens were recognized as genocides by Ukraine and the European Parliament respectively.

After World War II 

 Brno death march during the expulsion of Germans from Czechoslovakia in May 1945.
 Yugoslav death march of Nazi collaborators, 1945 (during the last days of World War II and after), a total of 280,000 Croats, were involved in the Independent State of Croatia evacuation to Austria. Mostly Ustashe and domobrans, but also civilians and refugees, tried to flee the Yugoslav Partisans and the Red Army, and marched northwards through Bosnia and Herzegovina, Croatia, Slovenia to Allied-occupied Austria. However, the British refused to accept their surrender and directed them to surrender to the Partisans, resulting in the death of 70–80,000 people as they were forced to march back to Croatia, Bosnia and Herzegovina or even to North Macedonia.
 During the 1948 Arab–Israeli War, some 70,000 Palestinian Arabs from the cities of Ramle and Lydda were forcibly expelled by Israeli forces. Lydda's residents had to walk 10-15 miles to meet up with the lines of the Arab Legion, while most Ramle residents were moved by bus. The event has come to be known as the Lydda death march.
 During the Korean War, in the winter of 1951, 200,000 South Korean National Defense Corps soldiers were forcibly marched by their commanders, and 50,000 to 90,000 soldiers starved to death or died of disease during the march or in the training camps. This incident is known as the National Defense Corps Incident.
 During the Korean War, prisoners who were held by the North Koreans underwent what became known as the "Tiger Death March". The march occurred while North Korea was being over-run by United Nations forces. As North Korean forces retreated to the Yalu River on the border with China, they evacuated their prisoners with them. On 31 October 1950, some 845 prisoners, including about eighty noncombatants, left Manpo and went upriver, arriving in Chunggang on 8 November 1950. A year later, fewer than 300 of the prisoners were still alive. The march was named after the brutal North Korean colonel who presided over it, his nickname was "The Tiger". Among the prisoners was George Blake, an MI6 officer who had been stationed in Seoul. While he was being held as a prisoner, he became a KGB double agent.
 The 1975 forced evacuation of Phnom Penh in Cambodia by the Khmer Rouge

See also 
 Carolean Death March (1718–1719)
 Samsun deportations (1921–1922)
 March of the Living
 Armenian genocide
 Assyrian genocide
 Greek genocide
 Flight and expulsion of Germans (1944–1950)
 Forced displacement
 Population exchange between Greece and Turkey
 List of ethnic cleansing campaigns

References

Further reading
 Bibliography of Genocide studies

War crimes by type
Forced marches
Military marching
Genocide